more commonly known as Rolly, is a Japanese musician and music producer.

Personal background 
Teranishi was born  in Kyoto. He grew up in Takatsuki, Osaka, Japan.

Professional background 
Teranishi is well-recognized as the lead guitarist and vocalist of the Japanese rock band, . Scanch continued until 1996. Once Scanch broke up, Rolly pursued his solo musical career and also acting.

Outside of Japan, Teranishi is known almost entirely for his role as Genesis in the Japanese thriller Suicide Circle (2002). He is in the movies Iden & Tity, Swallowtail, Get It On?. He also made an appearance as "Yaha" in the PlayStation 2 game Drag-on Dragoon 2.

Teranishi is a fan of Tim Burton and his works as a movie director; he owns a costume of his favorite Tim Burton character, Jack Skellington from The Nightmare Before Christmas. Being a big fan of The Rocky Horror Picture Show, he has made several appearances in the stage performances in Japan as Dr. Frank-N-Furter. Other stage performances include the role of Captain Hook in Peter Pan and the Fox and the Conceited Man in Le Petit Prince. His most recent stage role was in the first Japanese production of Tommy, playing the parts of Cousin Kevin and the Pinball Wizard.

2006 was the 15th-year anniversary of Scanch. All the members of Scanch reunited for two concerts that occurred on March 10 and March 17. It was also released on CD (Scanch’n’Roll Show II).

Teranishi starred in a TV show called Rock Fujiyama alongside Marty Friedman, ex lead guitarist of the thrash metal band Megadeth. Rolly also appears in his own television show Rolly Kingdom every two weeks, and also co-hosts KKTV, a family show that airs every Saturday night.

He has also contributed to the soundtrack of Kamen Rider Agito for his performance of the third ending theme "Deep Breath." This was the second song that he performed as the lead vocalist for Rider Chips, after being featured as a vocalist on "Power Child."

He recently voiced Tamatoa in the Japanese dub version of the Disney film Moana.

Discography 
Scanch
 Scanch’n’Roll Show (1988)
 Ultra Operation of Love Affair for All the Young Boys and Girls (1990)
 Ultra Romantic Bombers for the Unlimited Lovers of the World (1991)
 A Case Of Rosy Murder For Miracle Lovers Only (1992)
 Opera (1993)
 Gold (1994)
 Sweets – Scanch Best Collection (1994)
 Double Double Chocolate (1995)
 Historic Grammar (1996)
 CD & DVD – The Best Scanch (2005)
 Scanch’n’Roll Show II (2006)

Solo
 "Rolly's Rock Theater" (2016) 
 Rolly's RockyRolly (1996)
 Bootleg (1995)
 Rolly Original Musical Songs (2001)
 2001 (2001)
 Steel Hard Rocker (2003)
 Rolly in Aoiheya (2005)

Singles
 "SOS '99" (1998)
 "Muchi Muchi Rock'n'Roll" (1999)
 "Transformation" (2000)
 "Samurai" (2001) – the opening theme song to The Family's Defensive Alliance

Others
 Kamen Rider Black (Cover), Masked Rider Spirits 2000 Live (2000)
 21st Century Stars (1996)
 Kiss Tribute in Japan (1998)
 Kamen Rider Agito (2002)
 Rider Chips – Otonagai (2005)
 Heavy Metal Thunder (2005)
 The Auris (Super) Band (2006)
 Rock Fujiyama Band (2006)
 Tribute To David Bowie (2007)

Filmography
Film
 Suicide Club (2002)
 Saya Zamurai (2010)
 Too Young To Die! (2016)
 Hit Me Anyone One More Time (2019)

Television
 Garo: Makai no Hana (2014)

References

External links
 Rolly's official website
 Rock Fujiyama official website
 ROLLYWORLD
 

1963 births
Living people
Japanese rock guitarists
Japanese male singer-songwriters
Japanese singer-songwriters
Glam rock musicians
Musicians from Kyoto Prefecture
Musicians from Osaka Prefecture
People from Takatsuki, Osaka